Mt. Eden High School is a public high school in Hayward, California, United States, founded in 1960. It is part of the Hayward Unified School District. Mt. Eden High is located in southwest Hayward, near Union City.

Athletics 
Sports offered at Mt. Eden are:

Cross country
Football
Tennis
Volleyball
Swim
Basketball
Soccer
Wrestling
Baseball
Badminton
Softball
Track & field
Cheerleading
Golf

Notable alumni
 Dell Demps – NBA guard and general manager
 Spice 1 – rapper
 Mahershala Ali – actor
 George Mitterwald – baseball player
 Nic Taylor – Olympic bobsled
 James Monroe Iglehart – Tony Award winning Broadway actor, who played the Genie in Aladin and stars in Hamilton
 Dick Tidrow - MLB Pitcher for the New York Yankees - Senior Vice President of Player Personnel for the San Francisco Giants
 Neil Medeiros - Internationally recognized commercial advertising photographer - Master of Photography - Professional Photographers of America. Clients include : Peterbilt Trucks, Mack Trucks, Volvo and Freightliner Trucks. Western Star and Ford Trucks and Komatsu Heavy Equipment. Traveled the world wherever trucks were working.

References

External links 
 
 Hayward Unified School District

High schools in Alameda County, California
Hayward Unified School District
Educational institutions established in 1960
Public high schools in California
1960 establishments in California
Buildings and structures in Hayward, California